In eight-dimensional geometry, an eight-dimensional polytope or 8-polytope is a polytope contained by 7-polytope facets. Each 6-polytope ridge being shared by exactly two 7-polytope facets.

A uniform 8-polytope is one which is vertex-transitive, and constructed from uniform 7-polytope facets.

Regular 8-polytopes 

Regular 8-polytopes can be represented by the Schläfli symbol {p,q,r,s,t,u,v}, with v {p,q,r,s,t,u} 7-polytope facets around each peak.

There are exactly three such convex regular 8-polytopes:
 {3,3,3,3,3,3,3} - 8-simplex
 {4,3,3,3,3,3,3} - 8-cube
 {3,3,3,3,3,3,4} - 8-orthoplex

There are no nonconvex regular 8-polytopes.

Characteristics 

The topology of any given 8-polytope is defined by its Betti numbers and torsion coefficients.

The value of the Euler characteristic used to characterise polyhedra does not generalize usefully to higher dimensions, and is zero for all 8-polytopes, whatever their underlying topology. This inadequacy of the Euler characteristic to reliably distinguish between different topologies in higher dimensions led to the discovery of the more sophisticated Betti numbers.

Similarly, the notion of orientability of a polyhedron is insufficient to characterise the surface twistings of toroidal polytopes, and this led to the use of torsion coefficients.

Uniform 8-polytopes by fundamental Coxeter groups 

Uniform 8-polytopes with reflective symmetry can be generated by these four Coxeter groups, represented by permutations of rings of the Coxeter-Dynkin diagrams:

Selected regular and uniform 8-polytopes from each family include:
 Simplex family: A8 [37] - 
 135 uniform 8-polytopes as permutations of rings in the group diagram, including one regular:
 {37} - 8-simplex or ennea-9-tope or enneazetton - 
 Hypercube/orthoplex family: B8 [4,36] - 
 255 uniform 8-polytopes as permutations of rings in the group diagram, including two regular ones:
 {4,36} - 8-cube or octeract- 
 {36,4} - 8-orthoplex or octacross - 
 Demihypercube D8 family: [35,1,1] - 
 191 uniform 8-polytopes as permutations of rings in the group diagram, including:
 {3,35,1} - 8-demicube or demiocteract, 151 - ; also as h{4,36} .
 {3,3,3,3,3,31,1} - 8-orthoplex, 511 - 
 E-polytope family E8 family: [34,1,1] - 
 255 uniform 8-polytopes as permutations of rings in the group diagram, including:
 {3,3,3,3,32,1} - Thorold Gosset's semiregular 421, 
 {3,34,2} - the uniform 142,
 {3,3,34,1} - the uniform 241,

Uniform prismatic forms 

There are many uniform prismatic families, including:

The A8 family 

The A8 family has symmetry of order 362880 (9 factorial).

There are 135 forms based on all permutations of the Coxeter-Dynkin diagrams with one or more rings. (128+8-1 cases) These are all enumerated below. Bowers-style acronym names are given in parentheses for cross-referencing.

See also a list of 8-simplex polytopes for symmetric Coxeter plane graphs of these polytopes.

The B8 family 

The B8 family has symmetry of order 10321920 (8 factorial x 28). There are 255 forms based on all permutations of the Coxeter-Dynkin diagrams with one or more rings.

See also a list of B8 polytopes for symmetric Coxeter plane graphs of these polytopes.

The D8 family 

The D8 family has symmetry of order 5,160,960 (8 factorial x 27).

This family has 191 Wythoffian uniform polytopes, from 3x64-1 permutations of the D8 Coxeter-Dynkin diagram with one or more rings. 127 (2x64-1) are repeated from the B8 family and 64 are unique to this family, all listed below.

See list of D8 polytopes for Coxeter plane graphs of these polytopes.

The E8 family 

The E8 family has symmetry order 696,729,600.

There are 255 forms based on all permutations of the Coxeter-Dynkin diagrams with one or more rings. Eight forms are shown below, 4 single-ringed, 3 truncations (2 rings), and the final omnitruncation are given below. Bowers-style acronym names are given for cross-referencing.

See also list of E8 polytopes for Coxeter plane graphs of this family.

Regular and uniform honeycombs 

There are five fundamental affine Coxeter groups that generate regular and uniform tessellations in 7-space:

Regular and uniform tessellations include:
  29 uniquely ringed forms, including:
 7-simplex honeycomb: {3[8]} 
  135 uniquely ringed forms, including:
 Regular 7-cube honeycomb: {4,34,4} = {4,34,31,1},  = 
 7-demicube honeycomb: h{4,34,4} = {31,1,34,4},  = 
 , [31,1,33,31,1]: 77 unique ring permutations, and 10 are new, the first Coxeter called a quarter 7-cubic honeycomb.
  143 uniquely ringed forms, including:
 133 honeycomb: {3,33,3}, 
 331 honeycomb: {3,3,3,33,1},

Regular and uniform hyperbolic honeycombs 

There are no compact hyperbolic Coxeter groups of rank 8, groups that can generate honeycombs with all finite facets, and a finite vertex figure. However, there are 4 paracompact hyperbolic Coxeter groups of rank 8, each generating uniform honeycombs in 7-space as permutations of rings of the Coxeter diagrams.

References 

 T. Gosset: On the Regular and Semi-Regular Figures in Space of n Dimensions, Messenger of Mathematics, Macmillan, 1900
 A. Boole Stott: Geometrical deduction of semiregular from regular polytopes and space fillings, Verhandelingen of the Koninklijke academy van Wetenschappen width unit Amsterdam, Eerste Sectie 11,1, Amsterdam, 1910
 H.S.M. Coxeter:
 H.S.M. Coxeter, M.S. Longuet-Higgins und J.C.P. Miller: Uniform Polyhedra, Philosophical Transactions of the Royal Society of London, Londne, 1954
 H.S.M. Coxeter, Regular Polytopes, 3rd Edition, Dover New York, 1973
 Kaleidoscopes: Selected Writings of H.S.M. Coxeter, edited by F. Arthur Sherk, Peter McMullen, Anthony C. Thompson, Asia Ivic Weiss, Wiley-Interscience Publication, 1995,  Wiley::Kaleidoscopes: Selected Writings of H.S.M. Coxeter
 (Paper 22) H.S.M. Coxeter, Regular and Semi Regular Polytopes I, [Math. Zeit. 46 (1940) 380–407, MR 2,10]
 (Paper 23) H.S.M. Coxeter, Regular and Semi-Regular Polytopes II, [Math. Zeit. 188 (1985) 559-591]
 (Paper 24) H.S.M. Coxeter, Regular and Semi-Regular Polytopes III, [Math. Zeit. 200 (1988) 3-45]
 N.W. Johnson: The Theory of Uniform Polytopes and Honeycombs, Ph.D. Dissertation, University of Toronto, 1966

External links 
 Polytope names
 Polytopes of Various Dimensions
 Multi-dimensional Glossary

8-polytopes